Events from the year 1990 in the United Kingdom.

Incumbents
Monarch – Elizabeth II
Prime Minister – Margaret Thatcher (Conservative) (until 28 November), John Major (Conservative) (starting 28 November) 
Parliament – 50th

Events

January
 1 January
 Glasgow begins its year as European Capital of Culture, the first designated in the British Isles.
 Television debut of Rowan Atkinson's Mr. Bean in a Thames Television special.
 13 January – Some 50,000 people demonstrate on the streets of London to support of Britain's ambulance workers, as the ongoing ambulance crew strike continues four months after it began.
 18 January – The first MORI poll of the decade shows that Labour have a 12-point lead over the Conservatives with 48% of the vote. Liberal support is at its lowest for more than a decade as the Liberal Democrats gain just 5% of the vote.
 19 January – Police in Johannesburg, South Africa, break up a demonstration against the cricket match played by rebel English cricketers led by Mike Gatting.
 25 January – Burns' Day Storm: hurricane-force winds are reported to have killed 39 people in England and Wales.
 29 January – Lord Justice Taylor publishes his report in the Hillsborough disaster, which claimed the lives of 95 Liverpool F.C. supporters on 15 April last year. He recommends that all top division stadiums are all-seater by 1994 and that the rest of the Football League follows suit by 1999, but rules out the government's proposed ID card scheme to combat football hooliganism as "unworkable".

February
 9 February – Ayatollah Khamenei of Iran renews his predecessors' fatwa on British author Salman Rushdie, which was imposed last year following controversy over the author's book: The Satanic Verses.
 15 February
 The UK and Argentina restore diplomatic relations after eight years. Diplomatic ties were broken off in response to Argentina's invasion of the Falkland Islands in 1982.
 Neil Kinnock's dream of being Prime Minister appears closer to becoming reality as the latest MORI poll shows Labour on 51% with a 17-point lead over the Conservatives.
 20 February – Three people are injured in Leicester city centre by a bomb explosion.
 26 February – Fourteen people are killed as storms hit Britain. One of the worst-hit areas is Towyn in North Wales, where approximately 2,000 people are evacuated from their homes after huge waves smash a 200-yard hole in the sea wall and cause a major flood.
 27 February – Economists warn that house prices could fall by up to 10% this year.

March
 1 March – The Official Secrets Act 1989 comes into force.
 7 March – Halifax Building Society reveals that house prices rose by 0.3% last month – the first monthly rise since July last year.
 9 March – 37 people are arrested and 10 police officers injured in Brixton, London, during rioting against the new Community Charge.
 13 March – The ambulance crew dispute ends after six months when workers agree to a 17.6% pay rise.
 15 March
 Iraq hangs British journalist Farzad Bazoft for spying. Daphne Parish, a British nurse, is sentenced to fifteen years in prison for being an accomplice to Mr Bazoft.
 Britain's unemployment is now down to 1,610,000 – the lowest since 1978. However, it is a drop of just 2,000 on January's total and economists fear that a sharp rise in unemployment could soon begin as there are widespread fears of a recession.
 20 March – Chancellor John Major delivers the first budget to be broadcast on television.
 23 March – The Duke and Duchess of York's second daughter, Princess Eugenie of York, is born.
 31 March – Poll Tax Riots in London as 200,000 people protest in the week preceding official introduction of the Community Charge.

April
 1–25 April – 1990 Strangeways Prison riot in Manchester.
 2 April – An earthquake measuring 5.1 on the Richter scale and centred on the Shropshire town of Bishop's Castle is felt throughout much of England and Wales.
 4 April – Dr Raymond Crockett is struck off the medical register for using kidneys from Turkish immigrants who had been paid to donate them.
 5 April – Aldi, a German discount food supermarket chain, opens its first store in Britain, in Stechford, Birmingham.
 9 April – Four Ulster Defence Regiment soldiers are killed by an IRA bomb in County Down.
 10 April – With nineteen inmates at Strangeways Prison in Manchester still staging a rooftop protest against prison conditions, rioting has broken out at prisons in Cardiff and Bristol.
 11 April – Customs and Excise officers seize parts of an Iraqi supergun in Middlesbrough.
 19 April – Labour have a 23-point lead over the Conservatives in the latest MORI poll.
 29 April – Stephen Hendry, 21, becomes the youngest ever world snooker champion.

May
 May – Rover Group launches a new version of its popular Metro supermini, now branded as a Rover which has been the best-selling BL/Austin Rover car since its 1980 launch. At the same time, Vauxhall launches the Calibra, built by Opel in Germany, onto the UK market.
 3 May – The end of house price inflation is declared by Halifax Building Society, two years after the housing market peaked.
 4 May – Local council elections see Labour win more local council seats than the Conservatives. Neil Kinnock's hopes of victory in the next general election are further boosted by the fact that Labour have finished ahead in most of opinion polls for the last 12 months.
 7 May – The Prince and Princess of Wales (Charles and Diana) travel to Budapest for the first postwar British royal visit there.
 8 May – Billy Cartman, a 33-year-old grouter, becomes the sixth Briton to die in the construction of the Channel Tunnel when he is crushed by heavy machinery.
 11 May – Inflation now stands at 9.4% – the highest level for eight years.
 12 May – The final of the FA Cup ends in a 3–3 draw between Manchester United and Crystal Palace at Wembley Stadium.
 17 May – Manchester United win the FA Cup final replay 1–0 at Wembley Stadium, with the only goal of the game being scored by defender Lee Martin. Manchester United have now won the FA Cup seven times, equalling the record already held by Aston Villa and Tottenham Hotspur. 
 19 May
 British agriculture Minister John Gummer publicly feeds a hamburger to his five-year-old daughter to counter rumours about the spread of Bovine spongiform encephalopathy and its transmission to humans.
 Unemployment is reported to have risen for the first time in nearly four years.
 24 May – Bobby Robson announces that he will not be renewing his contract as manager of the England national football team after the World Cup in Italy this summer.
 25 May – The "rump" Social Democratic Party (consisting of members who backed out of the merger with the Liberal Party which formed the Liberal Democrats two years ago) finishes behind the Monster Raving Loony Party in the Bootle by-election, where Labour retain power under new MP Michael Carr. The by-election resulted from the death on 21 March of Allan Roberts, the previous Labour MP for the constituency, of cancer aged 46.
 30 May – France prohibits British beef and live cattle imports as a precaution against fears of BSE being spread.

June
 1 June – An army recruit is shot dead and two others are wounded by two suspected IRA gunmen in Lichfield, Staffordshire.
 3 June – The "rump" Social Democratic Party is wound up, two years after a splinter group refused to join up in the merger with the Liberal Democrats.
 7 June – France, Italy and West Germany lift bans on British beef imposed during the BSE outbreak.
 14 June
 The proposed high-speed rail link between London and the Channel Tunnel is shelved.
 Unemployment rises for the second month running, though by just over 4,000 to a total of 1,611,000 in May.
 20 June – Chancellor of the Exchequer John Major proposes the "hard ecu", a currency which would circulate into parallel with national currencies as an alternative to full monetary union.
 26 June – The Carlton Club in central London is bombed by the IRA, killing one and injuring 20.

July
 2 July – Girobank is privatised by sale to the Alliance & Leicester Group.
 4 July – England's hopes of World Cup glory are ended by a penalty shootout defeat in the semi-final against West Germany after a 1–1 draw in Turin.
 10 July
The first Hampton Court Palace Flower Show is opened by Princess Anne.
UEFA lifts the ban on English football clubs in European competitions, five years after all teams were excluded due to the Heysel disaster. 
 11 July – Labour MP's accuse the Conservative government of "fraud" amid allegations that the 1,600,000 fall in unemployment since 1986 includes a million people leaving the list without finding work.
 14 July – Trade and Industry Secretary Nicholas Ridley resigns following an interview in The Spectator in which he likened the European Community to Hitler's Germany.
 16 July
 An official report reveals that High Street sales are at their lowest since 1980, sparking further fears of a recession.
 Nigel Mansell, Britain's most successful racing driver of the last 10 years, announces that he is to retire from Grand Prix races at the end of the 1990 season.
 Graham Taylor, the manager of Aston Villa F.C., is appointed as the England team's new manager.
 17 July – German food superstore chain Aldi opens its first British store in Birmingham and plans to have up to 200 stores across the country by 1993.
 19 July – Saddam Hussein, dictator of Iraq, frees Daphne Parish from prison for "humanitarian reasons" and she returns to Britain.
 20 July
 An IRA bomb explodes at Stock Exchange Tower, the base of the London Stock Exchange.
 Michael Carr, Labour MP for Bootle, dies after just 57 days in parliament from a heart attack at the age of 43.
 24 July – A Roman Catholic nun and three police officers are killed by an IRA landmine in County Armagh.
 30 July – An IRA car bomb kills British MP Ian Gow, a staunch unionist, after he assured the IRA that the British government would never surrender to them.
 31 July – The England cricket team defeats the India national cricket team in a high-scoring Lord's test match totalling 1,603 runs.

August
 1 August – British Airways Flight 149 is seized by the Iraqi Army at Kuwait International Airport following the Iraqi invasion of Kuwait.
 3 August – The 1990 heat wave peaks with a temperature of 37.1 °C (98.8 °F) recorded at Cheltenham, Gloucestershire.
 5 August – Margaret Thatcher announces her desire for a new Magna Carta to guarantee basic rights for all European citizens.
 14 August – A survey carried out by the BBC reveals that 20% of taxpayers in England and Wales had not paid their Community Charge by 30 June this year.
 16 August – A MORI poll shows that Labour now has a 15-point lead over the Conservatives with 50% of the vote, while support for the Liberal Democrats has doubled to 10% over the last seven months.
 22 August – James MacMillan's symphonic piece The Confession of Isobel Gowdie premieres at The Proms in London.
 23 August 
 British hostages in Iraq are paraded on TV.
Ford launches the fifth generation of its Escort hatchback, estate and cabriolet and Orion saloon. The two models have combined sales figures which account more than 10% of new cars sold in Britain. Sales of the two new models begin in Britain and the rest of Europe next month. However, the new generation models are widely panned by the motoring press due to their bland styling and driving experience as well as an old engine range from their predecessors. 
 24 August – Irish hostage Brian Keenan is released in Beirut, Lebanon, after being held a hostage there for more than four years.
 27 August
 Four investors are found guilty in the Guinness share-trading fraud trial.
 The BBC begins broadcasting on Radio 5, its first new station for 23 years.

September
 September – The new Ford Escort and Orion go on sale, as does a new model from Nissan, the Primera which replaces the Bluebird and is produced in Sunderland. 
 8 September – York City footballer David Longhurst, 24, collapses and dies during a Football League Fourth Division match.
 10 September – Pegasus, a leading British travel operator, goes bankrupt.
 18 September – Air Chief Marshal Sir Peter Terry survives a murder attempt by IRA terrorists at his home near Stafford.
 22 September – John Banham, Director General of the Confederation of British Industry, warns that most of Britain is now affected by a recession and that there is worse to come. The latest CBI prediction is also the gloomiest since 1980, the last time Britain was in recession. Fears of a recession have been growing across most of the world since the autumn of last year. However, chancellor John Major denies that Britain is on the verge of a recession.
 26 September – Margaret Thatcher joins in with the politicians who are denying that the British economy is slumping into recession, despite manufacturers reporting their biggest drop in output since 1982, as well as a growing number of bankruptcies.

October
 2 October – Neil Kinnock cites education and training as key areas needing an improvement in standards when he addresses his party's conference in Blackpool.
 8 October
 Pound sterling joins the European Exchange Rate Mechanism.
 First members of the Women's Royal Naval Service to serve officially on an operational warship board Type 22 frigate HMS Brilliant.
 18 October – Eastbourne by-election in East Sussex takes place. David Bellotti of the Liberal Democrats wins the "safe" Eastbourne Conservative seat. The by-election results from the murder of Ian Gow by the IRA.
 23 October
 Treasury officials state that a "brief, technical" recession in the British economy is now inevitable.
 Edward Heath, the former British prime minister, leaves Baghdad on a plane bound for Heathrow Airport with 33 freed hostages. Saddam Hussein has promised to release a further 30 hostages in the near future.
 27 October – Economists predict that the current economic downturn will be confined to the second half of this year.
 29 October – Premiere of the BBC One comedy Keeping Up Appearances, which stars Patricia Routledge, Clive Swift and Geoffrey Hughes.

November
 November
 Government produces Planning Policy Guidance 16: Archaeology and Planning to advise local authorities on the treatment of archaeology within the planning process. Site developers are required to contract with archaeological teams to have sites investigated in advance of development.
 Neil Kinnock, who has been leader of the Labour Party since October 1983, is now the longest serving opposition leader in British political history.
 1 November
 Geoffrey Howe, Deputy Prime Minister, resigns over the government's European policy.
 Broadcasting Act makes bidding for independent television franchises more commercially based and relaxes regulation of television and radio broadcasting.
 Courts and Legal Services Act introduces major reforms of the legal profession and Courts of England and Wales.
 2 November
 Neil Kinnock announces his support for the adoption of a single European currency.
 British Sky Broadcasting (BSkyB) founded as a merger between Sky Television and British Satellite Broadcasting.
 8 November – The second Bootle by-election of the year sees Labour hold onto the seat once more with new MP Joe Benton gaining nearly 80% of the votes.
 12 November – The Football Association deducts Arsenal two points and Manchester United one point and fines both clubs £50,000 for a mass player brawl in a Football League match between the two clubs last month in a league match at Old Trafford.
 13 November – Geoffrey Howe makes a dramatic resignation speech in the House of Commons, attacking the Prime Minister, Margaret Thatcher's hostility towards the EC.
 14 November
 The CBI confirms that the whole of Britain is now in recession, with every region now reporting a fall in output.
 Former cabinet minister Michael Heseltine announces that he will challenge Margaret Thatcher's leadership.
 15 November – Despite constant disputes in the government and widespread doubt over Thatcher's position as prime minister and party leader, combined with recent by-election defeats and anger over the poll tax, the Conservatives have cut Labour's lead in the opinion polls to four points as they gain 41% of the vote in the latest MORI poll.
 19 November – Major job cuts are reported to be on the way at the Rover Group, Britain's largest independent carmaker.
 20 November – Margaret Thatcher fails to win outright victory in a leadership contest for the Conservative Party.
 22 November – Margaret Thatcher announces her resignation as Leader of the Conservative Party and therefore as Prime Minister, having led the government for more than 11 years and the Conservative Party for over 15 years. She is the longest serving prime minister of the 20th century.
 26 November – Plastic surgeons Michael Masser and Kenneth Paton are murdered in Wakefield, West Yorkshire.
 27 November – John Major is elected leader of the Conservative Party and becomes Britain's new Prime Minister, defeating Douglas Hurd and Michael Heseltine. At 47, Major will be the youngest British Prime Minister of the 20th century until 1997. He is to be officially appointed Prime Minister tomorrow at Buckingham Palace.
 28 November – John Major is officially appointed Prime Minister by the Queen, as Margaret Thatcher officially tenders her resignation after leaving 10 Downing Street for the last time.

December
 1 December
 Channel Tunnel workers from the United Kingdom and France meet 40 metres beneath the English Channel seabed, establishing the first land connection between the United Kingdom and the mainland of Europe for around 8,000 years.
 The CBI predicts that the recession will last longer than predicted, and that GDP is likely to fall by at least 1% in 1991.
 3 December – The mother of Gail Kinchin is awarded £8,000 in High Court, a decade after her pregnant 16-year-old daughter was killed by a police marksman who intervened with a siege at the Birmingham flat where she was being held hostage by her boyfriend.
 6 December
 Saddam Hussein announces that all British hostages in Iraq are to be released.
 House price inflation has returned and stands at 0.2% for November, the first year-on-year rise in house prices since February.
 8 December – 
The UK grinds to a halt following heavy snow overnight. Large parts of the country are without power after snowfall brings down power lines, disrupting the electricity supply. Many rural areas are cut off for several days, while the Army is called out to help restore power. 
There is grim news for the retail industry as a CBI survey reports that retail sales have hit a standstill and High Street employment will fall.
 11 December
 The first British hostages from Iraq released by Saddam Hussein arrive back in the UK.
 The government makes £42 million compensation available to the 1,200 British haemophiliacs infected with the AIDS virus through blood transfusions.
 12 December – The new chancellor Norman Lamont rules out an early cut in interest rates which critics, including opposition MP's, claim would be a quick route out of recession.
 13 December
 Russell Bishop is sentenced to life imprisonment for the abduction, indecent assault and attempted murder of a seven-year-old girl in Brighton in February this year. He was cleared of the murder of two young girls in Brighton four years ago but will be convicted for that crime in 2018.
 Poundland, a supermarket chain selling all items for £1, opens its first store at Burton-upon-Trent, Staffordshire.
 Netto, a Danish discount food supermarket chain, launches its first UK store in Leeds.
 The sharpest rise in unemployment since 1981 has taken it to more than 1,700,000, with 155,000 jobs having been lost in Britain since April. Economists blame high interest rates; a government method to combat inflation.
 19 December – Tony Adams, the Arsenal captain and England defender, is sentenced to four months in prison for a drink-driving offence committed near his home in Southend-on-Sea on 6 May this year. He is also fined £500 and banned from driving for two years.
 20 December
 British women Karyn Smith (aged 19) and Patricia Cahill (aged 20) receive 25-year prison sentences in Thailand for heroin smuggling after being arrested in Bangkok five months ago. Their lawyers are planning to ask for a Royal pardon.
 An era ends in the Rhondda, South Wales, when the last coalmine closes after more than 100 years of heavy coalmining in the region. 300 miners have lost their jobs and just seventeen will remain employed in the industry elsewhere in the valley.
 23 December – The nine-month-old daughter of the Duke and Duchess of York is christened Eugenie Victoria Helena.
 25 December – Storms on Christmas Day leave more than 100,000 British homes without power.
 26 December – The fatwa (order to kill) against Satanic Verses author Salman Rushdie is upheld by Ayatollah Ali Khamenei, more than one year after it was first issued. Rushdie is still living in hiding.
 27 December – The latest MORI poll shows that Conservative support has been boosted by the appointment of John Major, with his party now just four points behind Labour – eight months after Labour had peaked with a 23-point lead.
 29 December – Leading economists warn that the recession creeping upon Britain will deepen during 1991 and unemployment is likely to increase to well over 2,000,000 from the current total of over 1,700,000.
 30 December – An opinion poll shows Labour slightly ahead of the Conservatives for the first time since John Major became Prime Minister.
 31 December – 89-year-old romantic novelist Barbara Cartland becomes a Dame in the New Year's Honours.

Undated
 Inflation reached 9.5% for the first time since 1981.

Publications
 Iain M. Banks' novel Use of Weapons.
 Louis de Bernières' novel The War of Don Emmanuel's Nether Parts.
 A. S. Byatt's novel Possession: A Romance.
 Elizabeth Jane Howard's novel The Light Years, first of the Cazalet series.
 Hanif Kureishi's novel The Buddha of Suburbia.
 Ian McEwan's novel The Innocent.
 Terry Pratchett's Discworld novels Eric and Moving Pictures and The Bromeliad novels Diggers and Wings.
 Terry Pratchett and Neil Gaiman's novel Good Omens.

Births
 9 January –  Jonathan Gullis, politician
 14 January – Oli London, internet troll
 15 January – Paul Blake, English sprinter
 1 February
 Dan Gosling, English footballer
 Laura Marling, English folk-pop singer-songwriter
 6 February – Dominic Sherwood, English actor and model
 8 February 
 Jonathan Page, English footballer
 Emily Scarratt, English rugby union player
 13 February – Olivia Allison, swimmer
 17 February – Alex Banfield, operatic tenor
 19 February – Luke Pasqualino, actor
 20 February – Anjli Mohindra, actress
 28 February – Georgina Leonidas, actress
 1 March – James Lomas, actor
 2 March – Cadet, English rapper (d. 2019)
 5 March – Danny Drinkwater, English footballer
 19 March – Maddy Hill, actress
 23 March – Princess Eugenie of York, daughter of The Duke and Duchess of York
 28 March – Zoe Sugg, YouTuber and vlogger 
 10 April
 Ben Amos, English footballer
 Alex Pettyfer, actor
 20 April – Abby Mavers, English actress
 21 April – Chris Broad, YouTuber
 23 April – Dev Patel, actor
 27 April – Martin Kelly, footballer
 6 May – Craig Dawson, footballer
 16 May – Thomas Sangster, actor
 20 May – Josh O'Connor, actor
 28 May – Kyle Walker, footballer
 31 May – Chris Dobey, darts player
 2 June – Jack Lowden, actor
 9 June – Lauren Socha, actress
 13 June – Aaron Taylor-Johnson, actor
 16 June – John Newman, singer
 17 June 
 Jordan Henderson, footballer
 Laura Wright, singer
 5 July – Nikki Patel, actress
 7 July – Joe Marler, English rugby union player
 15 July – Olly Alexander, actor and singer
 21 July – Chris Martin, footballer
 24 July
Jay McGuiness, English pop singer
Dean Stoneman, English racing driver
 29 July – Joey Essex, reality TV personality
 30 July – Chris Maxwell, Welsh footballer
 3 August   
 James Baxter, actor
 Jourdan Dunn, model
 10 August – Tai Woffinden, speedway rider
 13 August –  Jamal Edwards, music entrepreneur (d. 2022)
 27 August – Madison Welch, glamour model
 14 September – Alex and Sam Lowes, twin brother motorcycle racers
 18 September –  Michael Smith, darts world champion
 21 September – Rob Cross, darts player
 27 September – Lola Kirke, English-born American actress and singer
 1 October – Charlie McDonnell, YouTube personality
 12 October – Henri Lansbury, English footballer
 20 October – Jamie George, English rugby union player
 14 November – Josh Warrington, boxer
 26 November – Danny Welbeck, footballer
 28 November – Holly Hale, model
 10 December – Bryony Page, trampolinist
 13 December − Joseph Garrett, YouTuber, gamer, author, actor, voice actor, and stop-motion animator
 17 December – John Rooney, footballer
 20 December – Bugzy Malone, English grime rapper
 26 December
 Heather Knight, cricketer
 Aaron Ramsey, footballer
 30 December – Joe Root, cricketer

Deaths
 6 January – Ian Charleson, actor (born 1949)
 7 January
 Gerald Gardiner, Baron Gardiner, Lord High Chancellor (born 1900)
 Edwin McAlpine, Baron McAlpine of Moffat, construction magnate (born 1907)
 8 January – Terry-Thomas, actor (born 1911)
 15 January – Gordon Jackson, actor (born 1923)
 2 February
 Kathleen Hamilton, Duchess of Abercorn, Mistress of the Robes to Queen Elizabeth The Queen Mother (born 1905)
 Harold McCusker, Ulster Unionist Member of Parliament (born 1940)
 15 March – Farzad Bazoft, journalist (born 1958)
 20 March – Victor Rothschild, 3rd Baron Rothschild, banker, intelligence officer and zoologist (born 1910)
 21 March – Allan Roberts, Labour Member of Parliament (born 1943)
 8 May – Tomás Ó Fiaich, cardinal (born 1923)
 18 May – Lorna Johnstone, equestrian (born 1902)
 1 June – Eric Barker, comedy actor (born 1912)
 9 June – Angus McBean, photographer (born 1904)
 25 June – Sean Hughes, Labour Member of Parliament (born 1946)
 30 June – Brian Tiler, footballer, manager and director (born 1943); died in Italy
 20 July – Michael Carr, Labour Member of Parliament for 57 days (born 1947)
 30 July
 Victor Cavendish-Bentinck, 9th Duke of Portland, diplomat (born 1897)
 Launcelot Fleming, Anglican bishop and polar explorer (born 1906)
 Ian Gow, Conservative Member of Parliament (born 1937)
 9 August – Joe Mercer, footballer and manager (born 1914)
 6 September – Len Hutton, cricketer (born 1916)
 7 September – A. J. P. Taylor, historian (born 1906)
 8 September – Denys Watkins-Pitchford, writer (born 1905)
 20 September – Michael Swann, Baron Swann, biologist (born 1920)
 5 October – Peter Taylor, football manager (born 1928)
 4 November – David Stirling, founder of the SAS (born 1915)
 5 November – Erich Heller, essayist (born 1911)
 7 November – Lawrence Durrell, writer (born 1912)
 14 November – Malcolm Muggeridge, journalist, author and media personality (born 1903)
 23 November – Roald Dahl, author (born 1916)
 24 November – Dodie Smith, novelist and playwright (born 1896)
 29 December – David Piper, curator and novelist (born 1918)

See also
 1990 in British music
 1990 in British television
 List of British films of 1990

References

 
Years of the 20th century in the United Kingdom
United Kingdom